Noah Bitsch (born 29 September 1989) is a German karateka. He has won medals at both the World Karate Championships and European Karate Championships with his best individual result being bronze at the 2014 World Karate Championships and silver at the 2015 European Karate Championships. He has also won medals in the men's team kumite event at several editions of both competitions. In 2013, he also won the silver medal in his event at the 2013 World Games held in Cali, Colombia.

He represented Germany at the 2020 Summer Olympics in Tokyo, Japan. He competed in the men's 75 kg event where he did not advance to compete in the semifinals.

Career 

He won two medals at the 2012 European Karate Championships in Adeje, Spain: the gold medal in the men's team kumite event and one of the bronze medals in the men's kumite 75 kg event. He won one of the bronze medals in the men's team kumite event at both the 2013 European Karate Championships held in Budapest, Hungary and the 2014 European Karate Championships held in Tampere, Finland.

At the 2013 World Games held in Cali, Colombia, he won the silver medal in the men's kumite 75 kg event. In 2015, he lost his bronze medal match in the men's kumite 75 kg event at the 2015 European Games held in Baku, Azerbaijan. In 2019, he competed in the same event at the 2019 European Games held in Minsk, Belarus where he did not advance to compete in the semi-finals.

In May 2021, he won one of the bronze medals in the men's kumite 75 kg event at the 2021 European Karate Championships held in Poreč, Croatia. In June 2021, he qualified at the World Olympic Qualification Tournament held in Paris, France to compete at the 2020 Summer Olympics in Tokyo, Japan.

Achievements

References

External links 
 

Living people
1989 births
Place of birth missing (living people)
German male karateka
Competitors at the 2013 World Games
World Games silver medalists
World Games medalists in karate
Karateka at the 2015 European Games
Karateka at the 2019 European Games
European Games competitors for Germany
Karateka at the 2020 Summer Olympics
Olympic karateka of Germany
21st-century German people